Falconwood railway station is situated in the suburb of Falconwood, London Borough of Bexley, and is served by the Bexleyheath Line. The station was opened much later than the remainder of the line, on 1 January 1936, to serve a growing area. A brick-built ticket office leads down to the cutting in which the station lies. Ticket barriers control access to the platforms.

Services

The typical off-peak service in trains per hour is:
 2 tph to 
 2 tph to London Cannon Street
 2 tph to 

During the peak hours, the station is served by an additional half-hourly service between Dartford and London Charing Cross.

Connections
London Buses routes B15 and B16 serve the station.

References

External links 

Falconwood Community Centre

Railway stations in the London Borough of Bexley
Former Southern Railway (UK) stations
Railway stations in Great Britain opened in 1936
Railway stations served by Southeastern
1936 establishments in England